Elections took place on Sunday 19 March 2017 in Saint Pierre and Miquelon, a self-governing territorial overseas collectivity of France. All 19 seats on the Territorial Council were up for election. The previous elections were held in 2012. The Archipelago Tomorrow Party won another supermajority of seats.

Results

References

Elections in Saint Pierre and Miquelon
Saint Pierre
Saint Pierre